Oqtosh is a city in Samarqand Region, Uzbekistan. It is the capital of Narpay District. Its population is 41,600 (2016).

References

Populated places in Samarqand Region
Cities in Uzbekistan